The horse Adios Butler, also known as "The Butler" (1956–1983), was a North American harness racing champion.

Background
Sired by the great Standardbred Adios and out of an obscure broodmare named Debby Hanover, Adios Butler was trained by Paige West and driven by Clint Hodgins in 1959.

Racing career
In 1959, Adios Butler won the Cane Pace, then the Little Brown Jug, where he was the first horse to win with a sub-two-minute mile, and finally the Messenger Stakes, doing it in track and stake record time to become the first pacer to capture the Triple Crown of Harness Racing for Pacers. In 1960 Adios Butler was sold in part to Ohio interests and while he remained in the care of Paige West he was driven throughout the rest of his career by Eddie Cobb. He stood at stud at Fair Chance Farms in Washington Court House, Ohio.

The following year, he lost only one race on a muddy track and later recorded a 1:54.3 mile, the then-fastest time in harness racing history. Adios Butler was named "United States Harness Horse of the Year" in 1960 and 1961 by the U.S. Trotting Association and the U.S. Harness Writers Association.

Stud record
After his racing career, he was retired to stud. Adios Butler went on to sire such notable pacers as Honest Story, Pantry Man, El Patron, Escondido, Van Kirk, Uncle Frank, Ocean Mouth, Dean Butler, Lord Butler, Trial Lawyer,  Starboard Butler and many others. This despite facing fertility problems throughout his career as a stallion.

See also
 List of historical horses

References 

American Standardbred racehorses
Harness racing in the United States
1956 racehorse births
1983 racehorse deaths
American Champion harness horses
Horse racing track record setters
Harness Horse of the Year winners
United States Harness Racing Hall of Fame inductees
Little Brown Jug winners
Cane Pace winners
Messenger Stakes winners
Triple Crown of Harness Racing winners